WSPW-LP (97.7 FM) was a high school radio station licensed to Parkersburg, West Virginia, United States. It served the Parkersburg-Marietta area with a Variety format.  The station was owned by Wood County Board Of Education.

The station was assigned the WSPW-LP call letters by the Federal Communications Commission on June 6, 2006. Its license was cancelled October 2, 2019.

References

External links
 Wood County School Home Page

High school radio stations in the United States
SPW-LP
Defunct radio stations in the United States
SPW-LP
Wood County, West Virginia
Radio stations disestablished in 2019
2019 disestablishments in West Virginia
Radio stations established in 2006
2006 establishments in West Virginia
SPW-LP